Fertile Municipal Airport  is a public use airport located  northwest of the central business district of Fertile, Polk County, Minnesota, United States. It is owned by the City of Fertile.

The airport originally belonged to a flying club. The airport became a municipal airport in order to be eligible for state and federal airport funds.

Facilities and aircraft 
It has one runway designated 14/32 with an asphalt surface measuring 3,002 by 60 feet (915 x 18.3 m).

For the 12-month period ending July 31, 2018, the airport had 7,800 general aviation aircraft operations, an average of 21 per day.

References

External links 
 

Airports in Minnesota
Transportation in Polk County, Minnesota
Buildings and structures in Polk County, Minnesota